Dârvari is a commune located in Mehedinți County, Oltenia, Romania. It is composed of two villages, Dârvari and Gemeni.

References

Communes in Mehedinți County
Localities in Oltenia